Mimoblennius cas is a species of combtooth blenny found in the western Indian ocean, around Comoros.  This species grows to a length of  SL. The specific name is an acronym which stands for the California Academy of Sciences where the holotype and paratypes are retained.

References

cas
Fish described in 1978
Taxa named by Victor G. Springer